Abdullah Al-Othaim Markets Company is a Saudi Arabia-based joint stock company, currently operating in Saudi Arabia and Egypt. Its main activities are food wholesaling, grocery stores, and malls.  the company operated 183 stores: - 143 supermarkets and hypermarkets, 27 convenience stores, and 13 wholesale outlets in Saudi Arabia, and 31 stores in Egypt. 

By 2008, Abdullah Al-Othaim Markets had completed the transformation from a private company to a publicly listed company.

Forbes ranked the company third in the Arab World for retail executive management in 2016. It also ranked the company in the top 100 companies in Saudi Arabian, and the top 200 companies in the Arab World. In 2020, Forbes Middle-East listed the company was one of the 100 largest public companies in the Middle-East.

References

External links
 Official website

Retail companies of Saudi Arabia
Retail companies of Egypt
Supermarkets of Saudi Arabia
Supermarkets of Egypt
Retail companies established in 1980
Companies based in Riyadh
Saudi Arabian brands
Companies listed on Tadawul
Saudi Arabian companies established in 1980